Pan Africa ILGA (PAI) is the African region of the International Lesbian, Gay, Bisexual, Trans and Intersex Association (ILGA). 

Pan Africa ILGA is based in South Africa but holds annual regional conferences in different locations in Africa. Its third regional conference was held in Botswana in June 2018. Pan Africa ILGA planned to hold its 2020 conference in West Africa, scheduling the conference to take place in Accra, Ghana in July 2020. However, they faced religious opposition. An Ashanti regional chief and imam voiced opposition, and Christian groups also voiced protest, leading the government of Ghana to ban the conference.

Executive Board

References

LGBT organizations based in Africa